NOAAS Discoverer (R 102), originally USC&GS Discoverer (OSS 02), was an American Oceanographer-class oceanographic research vessel in service in the United States Coast and Geodetic Survey from 1966 to 1970 and in the National Oceanic and Atmospheric Administration (NOAA) from 1970 to 1996.

Construction
Discoverer was laid down on 10 September 1963 by Aerojet General Shipyards at Jacksonville, Florida. A very serious fire in the area of her meat preparation room and freezers brought her construction to a stop, but it resumed and she was launched on 29 October 1964. Soon after launching, she was moved to the Maryland Shipbuilding and Drydock Company at Baltimore, Maryland, where she received a single computer system, the first system of its kind, which revolutionizing environmental data collection and processing; via the computer, Discoverers propulsion and other machinery was automated through a centralized engine room control (CERC) system, which measured and recorded the ships course and speed, magnetic field intensity, gravity, surface current, and temperature. She had chemistry, wet and dry oceanographic, meteorological, gravimetric, and photographic laboratories. She also had several precision oceanographic winches and an underwater observation chamber.

After successful sea trials – in which she outperformed her sister ship USC&GS Oceanographer (OSS 01), making  ahead,  more than she was designed for, and  astern – she was delivered to the United States Government on 15 December 1966. At  in length, she and her sister Oceanographer — which entered service nine months before Discoverer — were the largest vessels constructed for research purposes to date.

Operational career
The U.S. Coast and Geodetic Survey classified the ship as an "ocean survey ship" (OSS) and commissioned her as USC&GS Discoverer (OSS 02), the second Coast and Geodetic Survey ship of the name, on 29 April 1967 with Captain William F. Deane, USC&GS, in command. For 30 years, she operated in the Atlantic and Pacific Oceans and from the Arctic to the Antarctic ice shelf. By conservative estimates, she steamed more than  during her career, spending between 240 and 270 days of each year at sea.

Home-ported in Miami, Florida, Discoverers first assignment was to represent the U.S. Government at the 1967 International and Universal Exposition, or Expo 67, in Montreal, Quebec, Canada; She was on display there from 2 July 1967 to 9 July 1967

Following Expo 67, Discoverer embarked on an intensive study of the Gregg Seamount in the North Atlantic Ocean. The research was the first of its kind to be conducted on a seamount. Discoverers scientific expedition moored and recovered complex oceanographic instruments during the research. Despite encountering numerous malfunctions in the equipment, Discoverers personnel persevered.

Later in 1967, after a minor overhaul at Jacksonville, Florida, Discoverer operated on research expeditions in the Gulf of Maine and over the Atlantic Oceans Blake Plateau, investigating the status of manganese nodules on the ocean floor. She delivered personnel and equipment to the west coast of Africa, then headed back across the Atlantic to Cape Hatteras, North Carolina. Under the direction of Dr. Robert S. Dietz, she conducted operations in which data was used in the investigation of geological history and theories of continental drift.

When the Coast and Geodetic Survey and other United States Government agencies combined to form NOAA on 3 October 1970, Discoverer became part of the NOAA fleet as the research ship NOAAS Discoverer (R 102), the first NOAA ship to bear the name. Her home port later was shifted to Seattle, Washington. In 1985, she received a multi-beam bathymetric mapping sonar, the Inmarsat satellite communications system, and a Global Position Indicator.

During her years of service, Discoverers assigned projects varied from cruise to cruise, and it also was common for several different projects to be carried out aboard her simultaneously. The types of studies carried out were varied and included biological, chemical, geological and physical oceanography, meteorological, and seismic research. Discoverers major projects included the Aerosol Characterization Experiment (ACE), the Radiatively Important Trace Species (RITS), the World Ocean Circulation Experiment (WOCE), the  Combined Sensor Project (CSP), the Global Ocean-Atmosphere-Land System (GOALS) project, and NOAA's Vents project (involving the study of underwater volcanic and venting activity within  of the coast of the state of Washington along the southern Juan de Fuca Ridge the Blanco Fracture Zone, and a marginal subduction zone). Ancillary projects, carried out in addition to the main objectives of each cruise, included the Automated Shipboard Aerological Program (ASAP), the Cadet Training Program (for students from the California Maritime Academy, the United States Military Academy, and the United States Naval Academy), marine mammal observations (she averaged 23 sightings of marine mammals per year), use of her Shipboard Environmental Data Acquisition System (SEAS) (averaging 1,700 weather reports per year, she was among the top ten reporting ships in the program in each year from 1989 through 1996 and was the top reporter in 1992, 1993, and 1994), and the Teacher at Sea Program (in which teachers came aboard to observe operations in the Vents program).

During 1987, the United States Navy used Discoverer as a replacement for the Military Sealift Command oceanographic survey ship USNS Bowditch (T-AGS-21), installing Bowditchs narrow-beam mapping sonars, doppler sonar, and navigational equipment aboard Discoverer.

During her final field season in 1996, Discoverer provided the at-sea platform for two of the largest oceanographic experiments ever conducted—the first Aerosol Characterization Experiment and the final Pacific cruise for the World Ocean Circulation Experiment. These expeditions sought to determine the effects of atmospheric pollution on global climate, and to understand the physics of climate change on Earth. Results from these cruises were used to improve global climate, ocean circulation, and greenhouse gas models.

NOAA decommissioned Discoverer at Seattle, Washington, on 16 August 1996. She remained inactive in reserve in the NOAA Pacific Fleet at Seattle until she was scrapped at Aliağa, Turkey in 2010.

Shark attack
After biting Seaman Phil Buffington, inflicting wounds on his legs that would require over 50 stitches to close, the shark attacked Heather Boswell, a 19-year-old student aboard for a six-month stint working in Discoverers galley. Another crew member filmed the shark pulling her under, shaking her viciously, and biting off her left leg at mid-thigh. Three members of Discoverers crew—Matthew N. Ofthus, Jon M. Knox, and Lisa K. Glover—came to her rescue in a boat, with two pulling her from the shark's jaws and into the boat while the third beat the shark with a stick. The shark then moved toward a third swimmer who was still partially in the water while climbing onto Discoverer via a rope ladder, but shots fired by crewmen aboard Discoverer apparently drove it away before it could attack.

Boswell and Buffington were brought aboard Discoverer, where the ship's registered nurse, Lieutenant Commander Judeth L. Layne of the United States Public Health Service, took charge of treating them. In Seattle, Commander Lawrence F. Simoneaux, NOAA Corps, Lieutenant Commander James Herkelrath, NOAA Corps, and Lieutenant Commander Steve C. Stringfellow, U.S. Public Health Service, set up a command post which provided life-saving medical advice to Layne aboard the ship and arranged logistical support for the evacuation of Buffington and Boswell and the arrival of emergency medical teams. In 1994, for their efforts in rescuing and saving the lives of the two injured swimmers, Layne, Ofthus, Knox, and Glover received the Department of Commerce Gold Medal and Simoneaux, Herkelrath, and Stringfellow received the Department of Commerce Silver Medal.

A five-person Air Force Medical Team, led by Major Darr Lafon, MD and Major Larry Martindale, RN flew on a KC-135 from Howard AFB Panama to Easter Island to meet the ship and take care of the shark bite victims.  They had to go to the ship in small wooded Easter Island fishing boats and then climb the side of the ship to reach the deck. They spent four hours on the ship and stabilized Heather Boswell, who had lost almost half of her blood in the attack.  After multiple transfusions, the team and ship's crew transported Boswell through  swells to the fishing boat landing at Easter Island. They flew seven hours back to Panama and Boswell was taken to surgery at Gorgas Army Hospital for initial closure of what remained of her left thigh.  After stabilization overnight, with more transfusions for Ms Boswell, both victims were transported back to Seattle in a C-21 Learjet air ambulance.

Commemoration

See also
NOAA ships and aircraft

References
Notes

Bibliography
NOAA Marine Operations: NOAA Ship Discoverer
NOAA History, A Science Odyssey: Tools of the Trade: Coast and Geodetic Survey Ships: Discoverer
Prézelin, Bernard, and A. D. Baker III, eds. The Naval Institute Guide to Combat Fleets of the World 1990/1991: Their Ships, Aircraft, and Armament. Annapolis, Maryland: United States Naval Institute, 1990. .

External links
 

Ships of the National Oceanic and Atmospheric Administration
Oceanographer-class oceanographic research ships
Ships built in Jacksonville, Florida
1964 ships
Maritime incidents in 1994
Shark attacks